"Cotton Jenny" is a song written and recorded by Gordon Lightfoot for his 1971 album Summer Side of Life. The song was later released as a single by Canadian country-pop artist Anne Murray.

Anne Murray version 

Murray's version was released in January 1972 as the first single from her album Talk It Over in the Morning. It peaked at number 1 on the RPM Country Tracks chart. It also reached number 11 on the Billboard Hot Country Singles chart in the United States. The song also appears on Murray's 2007 album Anne Murray Duets: Friends & Legends, performed as a duet with Olivia Newton-John.

Chart performance

References

1972 singles
Gordon Lightfoot songs
Anne Murray songs
Song recordings produced by Brian Ahern (producer)
Songs written by Gordon Lightfoot
Capitol Records singles
1971 songs